Banksia purdieana is a species of bushy shrub that is endemic to Western Australia. It has broadly linear, pinnatipartite leaves with sharply-pointed lobes on the sides, yellow flowers in heads of about eighty and egg-shaped follicles.

Description

Taxonomy and naming
This species was first formally described in 1904 by Ludwig Diels who gave it the name Dryandra purdieana and published the description in the journal Botanische Jahrbücher für Systematik, Pflanzengeschichte und Pflanzengeographie. The specific epithet (purdieana) honours Diels's friend Alexander Purdie.

In 2007 Austin Mast and Kevin Thiele transferred all dryandras to the genus Banksia and renamed this species Banksia purdieana.

Distribution and habitat
This banksia grows in kwongan between Tathra National Park, Mogumber, Cadoux, Moorine Rock and Bendering in the Avon Wheatbelt, Coolgardie, Geraldton Sandplains, Jarrah Forest and Mallee biogeographic regions.

Conservation status
Banksia purdieana is classed as "not threatened" by the Western Australian Government Department of Parks and Wildlife.

References

purdieana
Plants described in 1904
Taxa named by Ludwig Diels